Mount Allison  is a peak of the Diablo Range, located in the East Bay southeast of Fremont, California.

Geography
Mount Allison is part of a ridge that also includes Mission Peak and Monument Peak. Unlike those other two peaks, Mount Allison is located on unincorporated private property owned by a broadcasting company.

Broadcasting antennas
Owned by Communication and Control, Inc. (CCI), a large free-standing broadcasting antenna on Mount Allison broadcasts two Spanish channels, channel 14 (Univision KDTV) and channel 48 (Telemundo KSTS). Several smaller towers and dishes are also present.

KTSF has relocated its transmitters to Mount Allison on May 7, 2018, previously located atop San Bruno Mountain. KTLN-TV and KAXT-CD relocated their transmitters to Mount Allison on June 1, 2018, previously located atop Mount Burdell.

Gallery

References

External links 
 
 
 

Diablo Range
Mountains of Alameda County, California
Mount Allison
Mountains of the San Francisco Bay Area
Mountains of Northern California